Sarah Jane Parton (born 1980 in Lower Hutt, New Zealand) is a new media artist based in Wellington, New Zealand.

Education
Parton studied Design and Fine Arts at Massey University's College of Creative Arts, graduating with a Bachelor of Fine Arts with Honours in Time-based Media in 2003. She taught at the college between 2004 and 2006, in 2008, and again in 2013. Since 2014 she has been a Lecturer in Critical Studies in the College's School of Art where she also contributes to studio programmes. Parton completed the International Institute of Modern Letters Masters in Creative Writing in 2013.

Career 
Her single channel video work, she's so usual (2003), was included in Telecom Prospect 2004: New Art, New Zealand – an inaugural survey of contemporary art at Wellington's City Gallery. Since then she has featured in a number of group shows and has held six solo exhibitions, including Guidance at The Physics Room, Christchurch and The Way at The City Gallery Wellington, both in 2007.

Parton has also created cover art for her partner Luke Buda's solo albums, and had a piece of her writing published in the journal Turbine.

In 2016, a feminist collective of five artists which she belongs to, Fantasing, received a 2016 Audio Foundation Artists in Residence award. Also in 2016, Parton spent three months as an artist-in-residence at an arts centre in Malaysia on an Asia New Zealand Foundation grant.

Parton has Cook Islands heritage and was a founding member of the New Zealand Cook Islands Arts Collective.

Personal life 
Parton lives in Wellington with her partner, musician Luke Buda (The Phoenix Foundation), and their two sons.

Exhibitions
Solo Shows

March – April 2009:     Bright Light, Twinset, Christchurch Art Gallery, Christchurch.
Sept – Oct 2008: 	Guidance, Seventh Gallery (Project Space), Melbourne, Australia.
June – August 2008:	Bright Light, The New Zealand Film Archive Media Gallery, Wellington.
August – Nov 2007:	The Way, City Gallery, Wellington.
April – May 2007:	Guidance, The Physics Room, Christchurch.
May 2004:		My sister's lashes, Enjoy Gallery, Wellington.

Collaborations and Performances

July 2008:	        The End (live performance), The New Zealand Film Archive Cinema, Wellington.
February 2008:	        Belonging (live performance), The New Zealand Film Archive Cinema, Wellington.
April 2006:		Macrofun, Show Gallery, Wellington.
Dec 2004 – Jan 2005: 	Tired of dancing, Show Gallery, Wellington.
Jan – Feb 2005: 	Postmark, Michael Hirschfeld Gallery, City Gallery, Wellington.

Group Shows/Screenings

April – May 2009:       New Work from New Zealand, Gallery Impaire, Paris, France.
March 2009:             Fountain Art Fair, temporary site in Hudson River Park, New York City.
February 2009:		The Japan Media Arts Festival, National Art Center, Tokyo, Japan.
October 2008:		Electro-projections 1, in Electrofringe – a Festival of Electronic Arts and Culture, Newcastle, Australia.
August – Sept 2007:	Territorial Pissings, The Engine Room, Massey University, Wellington.
August – Nov 2007:	Lost and Found Video Programme, Square2, City Gallery, Wellington.
August 2007:		Fronting Up, Enjoy Gallery, Wellington.
March – April 2007:	Artists' Film Festival, The New Zealand Film Archive, Wellington.
May – June 2006: 	Painted Faces, Michael Hirschfeld Gallery, City Gallery, Wellington.
March 2006:		Fresh Faced, Bartley Nees Gallery, Wellington.
July – Sept 2005:	Canned Heat, Blue Oyster Galley, Dunedin.
April – July 2005:	First Dance; Dancehall Stories from the Turnbull Library Collection and Beyond, The National Library Gallery, Wellington.
February 2005:		Frugal Pleasures – a Survey of New Zealand Video Art, City Gallery, Wellington and The New Zealand Film Archive, Wellington.
August – Sept 2004: 	Vanity Case, Michael Hirschfeld Gallery, City Gallery, Wellington.
June – August 2004: 	Prospect 2004: New Art, New Zealand, City Gallery, Wellington.

References

1980 births
Living people
Massey University alumni
New Zealand video artists
People from Lower Hutt
Academic staff of the Massey University
New Zealand people of Cook Island descent
21st-century New Zealand people
International Institute of Modern Letters alumni